Crimetime is an Australian film directed by Marc Gracie. It was the tenth movie of Boulevard Films and the first not written by Frank Howson. It was never completed due to the financial problems faced by Boulevard but was screened at the Melbourne Underground Film Festival in 2006 in rough cut form.

Plot
Policemen Robin Decker and John Little begin to realise they are probably the only two honest cops on the force.

References

External links

Australian crime drama films
1993 films
1990s English-language films
1990s Australian films